Wrestling Retribution Project was a planned professional wrestling television program developed by Jeff Katz. Founded in 2011, the promotion was based on a 13-week serial schedule.  Upon completion of production, the program was to be distributed by Image Entertainment, and available via streaming media and DVD.

History 
In early 2011, Former VP of Production at 20th Century Fox and New Line Cinema, Jeff Katz, began venting frustrations via his Twitter page with the current wrestling product broadcast worldwide by companies such as WWE and TNA.  In May 2011, he began a fundraising drive via the crowdfunding website Kickstarter with a goal to raise $100,000 for an alternative wrestling venture. By June 21, 2011, the goal was achieved through 187 pledges. Shortly thereafter, casting and pre-production of the series began. A thirteen-week first season was taped from October 10 to 12, 2011, at the Henson Recording Studios in Los Angeles, California. Fergal Devitt and Shawn Spears, who were both announced for the tapings, could not make it due to visa issues.

The project name was changed from Wrestling Revolution Project to Wrestling Retribution Project on November 21, 2011.

The project has faced numerous criticisms from donors, frustrated by the lack of information about whether the project is still forthcoming and what their money was spent on.

In June 2013 an update was posted to the Kickstarter page, with a link to the video of their Champion's Grail battle royal.

To date, the Kickstarter backers of the project have not received the end product which they funded, as Katz has not released the promised episodic footage.

On the Talk is Jericho podcast with Kenny Omega, Chris Jericho revealed that he helped fund the project but never saw the footage, and Omega told a story about how he broke a chandelier during filming when he performed an outside springboard moonsault to Karl Anderson and then was forced to work for free the rest of the tapings to pay for the damage.

In March 2020, during the COVID-19 pandemic, Katz decided to upload the footage in YouTube.

Cast 
The cast of WRP was unveiled via Geekweek.com, and includes wrestlers with experience with both major promotions, as well as the independent circuit.

References

External links 

2011 in professional wrestling
Kickstarter-funded television series